The black-and-tawny seedeater (Sporophila nigrorufa) is a species of bird in the family Thraupidae.

It is found in the Pantanal of eastern Bolivia and adjacent southwestern Brazil. Its natural habitat is subtropical or tropical seasonally wet or flooded lowland grassland. It is threatened by habitat loss.

It is also sparsely found in La Pampa Province in Argentina.

References

black-and-tawny seedeater
Birds of the Pantanal
Vulnerable animals
black-and-tawny seedeater
Taxonomy articles created by Polbot